Daniel H. Pulcifer (November 16, 1834 – January 19, 1896) was an American public official, printer, and politician.

Born in Vergennes, Vermont, Pulcifer learned the printing trade. In 1855, Pulcifer moved to the town of Oasis, Waushara County, Wisconsin and then moved to Shawano, Wisconsin. He served as Wisconsin Circuit Court clerk for Shawano County, Wisconsin. He also served as sheriff for Shawano County. Pulcifer was the deputy United States marshal and the United States Post Office inspector. Pulcifer served as mayor of Shawano, Wisconsin. In 1867 and 1879, Pulcifer served in the Wisconsin State Assembly and was a Republican. He then served as sergeant-at-arms for the Wisconsin Assembly. Pulcifer died suddenly of heart disease in Shawano. The community of Pulcifer, Wisconsin, in Shawano County, was named after him.

Notes

1834 births
1896 deaths
People from Vergennes, Vermont
People from Shawano, Wisconsin
People from Waushara County, Wisconsin
American printers
Wisconsin sheriffs
County officials in Wisconsin
Mayors of places in Wisconsin
19th-century American politicians
19th-century American businesspeople
Republican Party members of the Wisconsin State Assembly